WBEC-FM (95.9 MHz) is a commercial station in Pittsfield, Massachusetts. It is owned by Townsquare Media and broadcasts a Top 40 radio format.

WBEC-FM has an effective radiated power (ERP) of 1,000 watts.  The transmitter is off Alpine Trail in Pittsfield, near South Street (U.S. Route 20).

History
In 1975, the station signed on as WGRG-FM, airing a free form progressive rock sound.  At that time, it was not associated with WBEC 1420 AM.  WBEC had an FM station at 94.3 MHz dating back to the late 1940s, but gave it up in an era when few people owned FM receivers.  It later put another FM station on the air at 105.5 MHz; that station moved to Easthampton, Massachusetts, becoming WVEI-FM, in 2006.

From 1977 to 2006, the station was known as WUPE-FM. WUPE began operations in 1977 simulcasting the top 40 sound heard on WUPE 1110 AM.  WUPE-AM-FM later switched to soft adult contemporary and then oldies. After oldies, the WUPE-FM call sign and format were moved to 100.1 FM.

In August 2013, Gamma Broadcasting reached a deal to sell its Berkshire County radio stations, including WBEC-FM, to Reed Miami Holdings.  The sale was canceled on December 30, 2013. In October 2016, Gamma agreed to sell its stations to Galaxy Communications.  That sale also fell through, and in 2017 the stations were acquired by Townsquare Media.

References

External links

BEC
Adult top 40 radio stations in the United States
Pittsfield, Massachusetts
Mass media in Berkshire County, Massachusetts
Radio stations established in 1975
Townsquare Media radio stations